The Holy Trinity Statue is an obelisk in Șimleu Silvaniei, Romania.

History
The obelisk was opened in 1772 as a sign of gratitude because plague avoided locality which affected the region; the Russian plague of 1770-1772 claimed tens of thousands of lives. The Holy Trinity Statue was never moved from its original place. The statue was renovated in 2010.

Notes

External links
 Şimleu Silvaniei, Holy Trinity Statue

Monuments and memorials in Șimleu Silvaniei
Obelisks in Romania